The 40m2 Skerry Cruiser was a sailing event on the Sailing at the 1920 Summer Olympics program in Ostend. Four races were scheduled in each type. In total 8 sailors, on 2 boats, from 1 nation entered in the 40m2 Skerry cruiser.

Race schedule

Course area

Weather conditions

Final results 
The 1920 Olympic scoring system was used.

Notes 
 Since the official documentation of the 1920 Summer Olympics was written in 1957 many facts did disappear in time.

Other information

Sailors
During the Sailing regattas at the 1920 Summer Olympics the following persons were competing:

Further reading

References 

40m2 Skerry cruiser
40m² Skerry cruisers